The second cycle of the reality television show Asia's Next Top Model in which a number of women compete for the title and a chance to begin their career in the modeling industry. The show features aspiring models from the entire Asia-Pacific region. The international destination during the cycle was Hong Kong, becoming the second occasion in which the series traveled to the country, after cycle 1.

The show featured a larger cast. The number of contestants increased from 14 to 16, two from Indonesia, Malaysia, Philippines,  and Singapore, and one each from China, Hong Kong, India, Japan, South Korea, Taiwan, Thailand  and Vietnam. Nepal was unrepresented. This is the last season to feature a contestant from China. The show was filmed in Malaysia, and it premiered on January 8, 2014 on STAR World.

The prize package for this cycle included a modeling contract with Storm Model Management, a chance to be the cover feature of both Harper's Bazaar Singapore and Harper's Bazaar Malaysia, a S$50,000 cash prize from FOX International Broadcast, a chance of becoming the new face of TRESemmé 2014 campaign, and a Subaru XV.

The winner of the competition was 22-year-old Sheena Liam, from Malaysia.

Auditions
Casting calls were held in five countries, listed below:

August 11 at JW Marriott, Kuala Lumpur 
August 13 at JW Marriott, Jakarta 
August 15 at Siam Discovery, Bangkok 
August 17 at FOX International Studios, Singapore City

Cast

Contestants
(Ages stated are at start of contest)

Judges
 Nadya Hutagalung (host)
 Joey Mead King
 Mike Rosenthal
 Adam Williams

Episodes

Results

 The contestant was eliminated outside of judging panel 
 The contestant was eliminated
 The contestant was part of a non-elimination bottom two
 The contestant won the competition

Average  call-out order
Episode 13 is not included.

Bottom two/three

 The contestant was eliminated after their first time in the bottom two/three
 The contestant was eliminated after their second time in the bottom two/three
 The contestant was eliminated after their third time in the bottom two/three 
 The contestant was eliminated after their fourth time in the bottom two/three
 The contestant was eliminated after their fifth time in the bottom two/three
 The contestant was eliminated in the first round of elimination and placed third
 The contestant was eliminated and placed as the runner-up
 The contestant was eliminated outside of judging panel

Notes

References

External links
Official website
Asia's Next Top Model on Star World (archive at the Wayback Machine)

Asia's Next Top Model
2014 Malaysian television seasons
Television shows filmed in Malaysia
Television shows filmed in Hong Kong